Samuel Thornton may refer to:

 Samuel Thornton (MP) (1754–1838), director of the Bank of England and British Member of Parliament
 Samuel Thornton (bishop) (1835–1917), Anglican bishop
 Samuel W. Thornton, farmer, businessman, soldier, and politician in the Nebraska State Legislature